Group A of the 2011 Fed Cup Americas Zone Group II was one of two pools in the Americas Zone of the 2011 Fed Cup. Five teams competed in a round robin competition, with the teams proceeding to their respective sections of the play-offs: the top two teams play for advancement to the 2012 Group I.

Puerto Rico vs. Dominican Republic

Guatemala vs. Trinidad and Tobago

Puerto Rico vs. Uruguay

Guatemala vs. Dominican Republic

Guatemala vs. Uruguay

Dominican Republic vs. Trinidad and Tobago

Puerto Rico vs. Trinidad and Tobago

Dominican Republic vs. Uruguay

Puerto Rico vs. Guatemala

Trinidad and Tobago vs. Uruguay

See also
Fed Cup structure

References

External links
 Fed Cup website

2011 Fed Cup Americas Zone